Viscount Powerscourt is a title that has been created three times in the Peerage of Ireland, each time for members of the Wingfield family. It was created first in 1618 for the Chief Governor of Ireland, Richard Wingfield. However, this creation became extinct on his death in 1634. It was created a second time in 1665 for Folliott Wingfield. He was the great-great-grandson of George Wingfield, uncle of the first Viscount of the 1618 creation. However, the 1665 creation also became extinct on the death of its first holder in 1717.

It was created for a third time in 1744 for Richard Wingfield, along with title of Baron Wingfield, of Wingfield in the County of Wexford. He was the grandson of Lewis Wingfield, uncle of the first Viscount of the 1665 creation. Richard Wingfield had earlier represented Boyle in the Irish House of Commons. His eldest son, the second Viscount, represented Stockbridge in the British House of Commons. He was succeeded by his younger brother, the third Viscount, who married into the House of Stratford (from which all latter holders of the Powerscourt Viscountcy descend). The latter's grandson, the fifth Viscount, sat in the House of Lords as an Irish Representative Peer from 1821 to 1823. His son, the sixth Viscount, sat as a Member of Parliament for Bath. On his death the titles passed to his son, the seventh Viscount, who was an Irish Representative Peer from 1865 to 1885. The latter year he was created Baron Powerscourt, of Powerscourt in the County of Wicklow, in the Peerage of the United Kingdom. This peerage gave him and his descendants an automatic seat in the House of Lords until the passing of the House of Lords Act 1999. His son, the eighth Viscount, served as Lord Lieutenant of County Wicklow and was a member of the short-lived Senate of Southern Ireland.  the titles are held by his great-grandson, the eleventh Viscount, who succeeded his father in 2015.

The family seat was the once vast Powerscourt House, near Enniskerry, County Wicklow.

Viscounts Powerscourt, First Creation (1618)
Richard Wingfield, 1st Viscount Powerscourt (1550–1634)

Viscounts Powerscourt, Second Creation (1665)
 Folliott Wingfield, 1st Viscount Powerscourt (1642–1717)

Viscounts Powerscourt, Third Creation (1744)

 Richard Wingfield, 1st Viscount Powerscourt (1697–1751)
 Edward Wingfield, 2nd Viscount Powerscourt (1729–1764)
 Richard Wingfield, 3rd Viscount Powerscourt (1730–1788)
 Richard Wingfield, 4th Viscount Powerscourt (1762–1809)
 Richard Wingfield, 5th Viscount Powerscourt (1790–1823)
 Richard Wingfield, 6th Viscount Powerscourt (1815–1844)
 Mervyn Wingfield, 7th Viscount Powerscourt (1836–1904)
 Mervyn Richard Wingfield, 8th Viscount Powerscourt (1880–1947)
 Mervyn Patrick Wingfield, 9th Viscount Powerscourt (1905–1973)
 Mervyn Niall Wingfield, 10th Viscount Powerscourt (1935–2015)
 Mervyn Anthony Wingfield, 11th Viscount Powerscourt (born 1963)

The heir presumptive to the viscountcy is the current holder's fifth cousin once removed: Richard David Noel Wingfield (born 1966), a great-great-great-grandson of the Rev. Hon. Edward Wingfield (1792–1874), the third son of the fourth Viscount. He has a son, Dylan.

There is no heir to the barony created in 1885.

  Richard Wingfield, 3rd Viscount Powerscourt (1730–1788)
 Richard Wingfield, 4th Viscount Powerscourt (1762–1809)
 Richard Wingfield, 5th Viscount Powerscourt (1790–1823)
 Richard Wingfield, 6th Viscount Powerscourt (1815–1844)
 Mervyn Wingfield, 7th Viscount Powerscourt (1836–1904)
 Mervyn Richard Wingfield, 8th Viscount Powerscourt (1880–1947)
 Mervyn Patrick Wingfield, 9th Viscount Powerscourt (1905–1973)
 Mervyn Niall Wingfield, 10th Viscount Powerscourt (1935-2015)
 Mervyn Anthony Wingfield, 11th Viscount Powerscourt (born 1963)
Reverend Hon. Edward Wingfield (1792–1874)
Richard Robert Wingfield (1820–1896)
Richard William Wingfield (1849–1918)
Noel Sparks Wingfield (1907–1992)
Patrick Noel Wingfield (1934–2018)
(1) Richard David Noel Wingfield (born 1966)
(2) Dylan Patrick Wingfield (b. 1999)
(3) Jeremy James Wingfield (born 1974)
George John Wingfield (1822–1860)
Sir Anthony Henry Wingfield (1857–1952)
Anthony Edward Foulis Wingfield (1892–1946)
Gervase Christopher Brinsmade Wingfield (1931–1964)
(4). Andrew Nicholas Brinsmade Wingfield (b. 1959)
(5). Edward Nicholas Anthony Wingfield (b. 1991)
(6). Henry John Gervase Wingfield (b. 1994)
Edward ffolliott Wingfield (1823–1865)
Edward Rhys Wingfield (1849–1901)
Mervyn Edward George Rhys Wingfield  (1872–1952)
Charles Talbot Rhys Wingfield (1924–2007)
(7). Richard Mervyn Rhys Wingfield (b. 1967)
(8). Alexander Wingfield (b. 2003)
(9). Edward Wingfield (b. 2005)
(10). Charles Wingfield (b. 2008)
(11). David de Cardonnel ffolliot Rhys Wingfield (b. 1933)
(12). Jonathan Fitz Uryan Rhys Wingfield (b. 1935)
William Jocelyn Rhys Wingfield (1873–1942)
William Thomas Rhys Wingfield (1907–1976)
(13). Jocelyn James Rhys Wingfield  (b. 1937)
Robert Taylor Rhys Wingfield (1940–1999)
(14).  James Hamilton Rhys Wingfield (b. 1971)
(15).  Charles Timothy Wingfield  (b. 1974)
(16). George Anthony Rhys Wingfield (b. 1942)
(17). Rupert Bolingbroke Rhys Wingfield (b. 1972)
(18).  James Robert Rhys Wingfield (b. 2006) 
(19). Michael Somerset Rhys Wingfield (b. 1975)
Cecil John Talbot Rhys Wingfield (1881–1915)
Edward William Rhys Wingfield (1905–1984)
(20). Philip John Wingfield (b. 1938)
(21). Edward Mervyn Wingfield (b. 1973)
Rev. Hon. William Wingfield (1799–1880)
Richard Thomas Wingfield (1835–1870)
Rev. William Edward Wingfield (1867–1927)
John Anthony David Wingfield (1905–1983)
(22). John Mervyn Wingfield (b. 1944)
(23).  Richard John Wingfield (b. 1972)
(24). David Mervyn Wingfield  (b. 1975)
(25).  Christopher Robert Wingfield (b. 1978)
(26). Robert Edward Melville Wingfield (b. 1950)
(27).  Jeremy Wingfield  (b. 1981)
Mervyn Robert George Wingfield (1911–2005)
(28). Richard Mervyn Wingfield  (b. 1942)
(29). James Richard Wingfield (b. 1973)
(30).   Kit George Oscar Wingfield (b. 2009)
(31). Noah William Gray Wingfield (b. 2014)
(32). William Peter Wingfield  (b. 1948)
Hon. John Wingfield-Stratford (1772–1850)
John Wingfield-Stratford (1810–1881)
Francis Mervyn Wingfield-Stratford  (1864–1932)
Mervyn Verner Wingfield-Stratford (1907–1982)
(33). Mervyn Peter Douglas Wingfield-Stratford (b. 1936)
(34). James Richard Mervyn Wingfield-Stratford (b. 1973)

Ancestry

Notes

References
Kidd, Charles, Williamson, David (editors). Debrett's Peerage and Baronetage (1990 edition). New York: St Martin's Press, 1990.

External links

Viscountcies in the Peerage of Ireland
Extinct viscountcies in the Peerage of Ireland
Noble titles created in 1618
Noble titles created in 1665
Noble titles created in 1744
Stratford family